WMIN (1010 AM, "Uptown 1010") is a radio station licensed to serve Sauk Rapids, Minnesota, United States.  The station is part of the Tri-County Broadcasting group and the broadcast license is held by the Herbert M. Hoppe Revocable Trust.

Programming
WMIN broadcasts an adult standards / big band / middle of the road music format that they call "Ring-a-ding Standards".  Each song is followed by an announcement of artist and title.

Network news comes from Fox News Radio, at the top and bottom of each hour.

History
This station received its original construction permit from the Federal Communications Commission on September 27, 2005.  The new station was assigned the call sign WPPI by the FCC on October 4, 2005.

In late August 2008, the station went on the air as WPPI, temporarily carrying the "i101" Modern Rock format that had aired on a subcarrier of sister station of WHMH 101.7.

The station was assigned new call sign WMIN by the FCC on December 2, 2008.  WMIN received its license to cover from the FCC on May 18, 2009.

The station shares towers with three of its sister stations. There are seven total towers at the transmitter site.

References

External links
WMIN official website

Radio stations in Minnesota
Adult standards radio stations in the United States
Nostalgia radio in the United States
Benton County, Minnesota
Radio stations established in 2005
Radio stations in St. Cloud, Minnesota